The Directorate of Professional Standards (DPS) is a directorate of London's Metropolitan Police Service. The Directorate is responsible for investigating complaints against the professional conduct of Officers, the DPS was a realignment of the Complaints Investigation Bureau (CIB) after changes to the police regulations and the way complaints were handled after the Police Reform Act 2002.

The DPS focuses on standards, and the enforcement of them, in leadership and supervision, security of information and intelligence, recognition of the diversity of communities and staff, identifying and reacting to organisational and individual learning, and maintaining the threat of detection, prevention and management of risk.

The organisation's duty is wider than the issues of complaints and corruption. There are obligations to treat staff fairly and to be seen as an employer of choice, thus the highest standards must be applied to internal processes as well. In order to achieve this the Directorate has been expanded to encompass employment tribunals, civil actions against the commissioner and the vetting of staff.

The Directorate of Professional Standards is headed by an Assistant Commissioner.

References
 Directorate of Professional Standards

Police oversight organizations
Metropolitan Police units